= American Journal of Hospice and Palliative Medicine =

- Discipline: Health care
- Language: English
- Edited by: Robert E. Enck

Publication details
- History: 1984-present
- Publisher: SAGE Publications
- Frequency: Monthly
- Impact factor: 1.655 (2018)

Standard abbreviations
- ISO 4: Am. J. Hosp. Palliat. Med.

Indexing
- ISSN: 1049-9091
- LCCN: 90660226
- OCLC no.: 315924233

Links
- Journal homepage; Online access; Online archive

The American Journal of Hospice and Palliative Medicine is a peer-reviewed medical journal that covers the field of health care. The editor-in-chief is Robert E. Enck (East Tennessee State University). It was established in 1984 and is published by SAGE Publications.

== Abstracting and indexing ==
The journal is abstracted and indexed in Scopus and the Science Citation Index Expanded. According to the Journal Citation Reports, its 2018 impact factor is 1.655.
